The United Opposition was a political party in the Philippines. It called itself the "Genuine Opposition" coalition throughout the duration of the 2007 midterm elections.

History
The United Opposition party was created by Makati Mayor Jejomar Binay in June 2005 to unite all politicians who wished to impeach Philippine President Gloria Macapagal Arroyo. The UNO started scouting candidates for the Senate as early as October 2006 to claim a large share of the Senate seats. In January 2007, UNO started short-listing its nominees after a large number of interested personalities wanted to join the opposition. The UNO changed its name on February 12, 2007, at the Club Filipino in San Juan, Metro Manila to "Grand and Broad Coalition" (GBC). On February 15, 2007, the group changed its name again to Genuine Opposition (GO) after a meeting with Senate President Manny Villar in his office in Las Piñas. GO became the opposition coalition with eight parties under its wing, including its predecessor, UNO.  Though Senate President Manny Villar and Senate Majority Leader Francis Pangilinan are running under the Opposition, they remain independent candidates as in the 2001 election. On February 28, 2007, Genuine Opposition dropped Francis Pangilinan as its adopted candidate.

Post-2007 election
On January 23, 2008, former Senate President Ernesto Maceda, chairman emeritus of UNO announced that United Opposition spokesman Adel Tamano, former Cavite congressman Gilbert Remulla, incumbent Bukidnon congressman Teofisto Guingona III, incumbent Senators Jose "Jinggoy" Estrada and Maria Ana Consuelo "Jamby" Madrigal-Valade are the 2010 senatorial bets of the opposition and "vice presidential materials.”

See also
Koalisyon ng Nagkakaisang Pilipino (2004)
Genuine Opposition (2007)
United Nationalist Alliance (2013, 2016 and 2019)
Pwersa ng Masang Pilipino
PDP–Laban

References

Defunct political parties in the Philippines
Liberal parties in the Philippines
Centrist parties in the Philippines
2005 establishments in the Philippines